Sayonara (1954) is a novel published by American author James A. Michener. Set during the early 1950s, it tells the story of Major Gruver, a soldier stationed in Japan, who falls in love with Hana-Ogi, a Japanese woman. The novel follows their cross-cultural Japanese romance and illuminates the racism of the post-World War II time period.

Film adaptation
Sayonara was made into a film of the same name in 1957 directed by Joshua Logan and starring Marlon Brando.

References

1954 American novels
Novels by James A. Michener
Random House books
Novels set in Japan
Novels set in the 1950s
American novels adapted into films
Japan in non-Japanese culture